Eustace Edward Green Sr. (1845-1931) was a state legislator and educator in North Carolina and a doctor in Georgia.

Biography 

He was born enslaved February 3, 1845 and was freed on the arrival of the Union Army in Wilmington on February 25, 1865 towards the end of the American Civil War. He started work as a carpenter whilst obtaining an education in night school. He then went on to graduate in 1872 from Lincoln University in Pennsylvania and then get a master's degree from the same university.
              
Green started working as a teacher, worked in the court as a clerk and also became a school principal. He was founder and president of the Colored Medical Association as well as being president of the National Medical Association. He served on a county board of examiners and as a deputy clerk for a court.

He was a delegate to the 1868 constitutional convention and both the General Assemblies of 1868-1869 and 1869-1870.   

In 1879 he married Georgia Cherry of Tarboro, North Carolina, daughter of former representative Henry C. Cherry and they had four children together.

Green was elected to the North Carolina House of Representatives representing New Hanover County in 1882 whilst he was living in Wilmington and working as a school principal. He was a Republican and he was also anti-prohibition at the time, but criticised for being pro-prohibition the year before. He was nominated for the position of Speaker of the House but withdrew his name not wishing to offend party leaders. He served from in 1882 and 1883 and was selected for three committees: Propositions and Grievances, Penal Institutions and Education.

After his political career he decided to become a doctor and he graduated from Howard University Medical School in 1886. After moving to Macon, Georgia in 1890 with his wife and children Green opened up a pharmacy called Central City Drug Store and also became a landowner and landlord. Together they advocated African-American education including teaching Henry Rutherford Butler who would go on to be Georgia's first African American pharmacist and marry Selena Sloan Butler.

He died June 1, 1931 in Detroit whilst visiting his family. He is buried at Linwood Cemetery in Macon, Georgia. He lived at 353 Madison Street. His home is extant.

See also

 African-American officeholders during and following the Reconstruction era

References

External links

1845 births
1931 deaths
African-American physicians
Lincoln University (Pennsylvania) alumni
Members of the North Carolina House of Representatives
People from Macon, Georgia
Howard University College of Medicine alumni
Physicians from Georgia (U.S. state)
Politicians from Wilmington, North Carolina
American freedmen
19th-century African-American politicians
19th-century American politicians
African-American pharmacists
19th-century American physicians
19th-century African-American educators
African-American schoolteachers
Schoolteachers from North Carolina
American school principals
19th-century American educators